The Lao People's Liberation Army Air Force (LPLAAF) is the air force of Laos.

History
The present-day LPLAAF is descended from the Aviation Laotienne, which was established by the French and later became the Royal Lao Air Force. Pathet Lao guerrilla forces began to operate a few aircraft from 1960, as did another rebel group led by Kong Le. Kong Le forces were later re-incorporated into the Royal Lao Air Force. The communist take-over in 1975 resulted in the adoption of the present title.

Military co-operation agreement with Russia in 1997 resulted in 12 Mil Mi-17 (second handed) helicopters that entered service in mid-1999 to follow on from previous deliveries of Mi-8s. SAM systems also entered service such as the SA-3 'Goa'.

Bases
The LPLAAF operates from two main bases—Vientiane and Phonsavan—with another three bases supported by detachments from the main units. Apart from the main military air bases, there are also a number of smaller airports and airfields around the country which are frequently used by the air force and the semi-military airline Lao Airlines. In 1961 Laos had 25 airstrips capable of landing a C-47.

 Wattay International Airport
 Long Tieng
 Pakse International Airport
 Xieng Khouang Airport

Aircraft

Current inventory

References 

Laos
Military of Laos
Military units and formations established in 1976